Djiguenni  is a town and commune in Mauritania on the border of Mali.

In November 2007, it was the scene of violent riots against food prices.

Population

At the time of the 2000 census, the population stood at 10,862.

References

Communes of Mauritania